Princess Tatiana Alexandrovna Yusupova (29 June 1829 — 14 January 1879) was a Russian noblewoman and lady-in-waiting to Empress Alexandra, of the Imperial Court of Russia. She was the Countess Ribeaupierre and wife of one of the richest landowners .

Biography 
She was a niece of Prince Potemkin by her mother.

Children and grandchildren 

 Zinaida Nikolaevna Yusupova (1861–1939); ∞ Count Felix Sumarokov-Elston (1856–1928)
 Nikolai Felixovich Yusupov (1883–1908)
 Felix Felixovich Yusupov (1887–1967); ∞ Princess Irina Alexandrovna Romanova (1895–1970)
 Boris Nikolayevich Yusupov (*/† 1863)
 Tatiana Nikolayevna Yusupova (1866–1888)

References

1829 births
1879 deaths
People from Lucca
Tatiana
Ladies-in-waiting from the Russian Empire
Deaths from diabetes
Burials at Nikolskoe Cemetery
Russian princesses by marriage